Bang Yai is a district (amphoe) in the western part of Nonthaburi province, central Thailand.

History
The district was created in 1917 as a minor district (king amphoe) by splitting it from the districts Bang Kruai and Bang Bua Thong. In 1921 it was elevated to full district status. Originally named Bang Mae Nang, on 19 October 1930 it was renamed "Bang Yai", the original name of Bang Kruai District.

Geography
Neighbouring districts are (from the north clockwise) Sai Noi, Bang Bua Thong, Mueang Nonthaburi, Bang Kruai, and Phutthamonthon of Nakhon Pathom province.

Administration
The district is divided into six sub-districts (tambons), which are further subdivided into 66 villages (mubans). Since 2020 Bang Mae Nang has had town (thesaban mueang) status, covering most parts of tambon Bang Mae Nang. There are five townships (thesaban tambons). Bang Muang covers parts of tambons Bang Muang, Bang Len, and Sao Thong Hin; Bang Yai covers parts of tambons Bang Mae Nang, Bang Yai, and Ban Mai; Sao Thong Hin covers most parts of tambon Sao Thong Hin; Bang Len covers most parts of tambon Bang Len; and Ban Bang Muang covers most parts of tambon Bang Muang. There are a further two tambon administrative organizations (TAO) responsible for the non-municipal areas of tambons Bang Yai and Ban Mai.

References

External links
amphoe.com

Bang Yai